Polish I Corps in Russia was a military formation formed on 24 July 1917 in Minsk from Polish and Lithuanian personnel serving in the Western and Northern Fronts of the Russian Army. 

In the chaotic period at the end of  World War I on the Eastern Front, the Polish I Corps fought against the Bolshevik Red Army, cooperated with the German Ober Ost forces in taking Minsk, and after acknowledging the Regency Council in May 1918, it surrendered to the German forces in Babruysk. The soldiers were given safe passage to Warsaw, where they became part of the newly created Polish Army.

History

Formation
The corps was formed at the initiative of the Chief Polish Military Committee (Naczelny Polski Komitet Wojskowy), a Polish faction in the revolutionary and split Russian Empire military. Its goal was to defend Poles inhabiting parts of Poland under Russian partitions and support the formation of independent Poland.  

In the immediate aftermath of the February Revolution, the Russian Provisional Government's obvious weakness, its half-hearted declaration of the right of nations to self-determination and Germany's promises of autonomy in occupied Poland stirred up long suppressed nationalist feelings among ethnic Poles living within the Russian Empire since the partitions of Poland. Roughly 700,000 of them were serving in the Russian military by 1917 and they began forming a Polish army to fight for a "united and free Poland" with the assent of the Provisional Government and general Lavr Kornilov of the Russian Army. In August, the newly formed Chief Polish Military Committee (Naczelny Polski Komitet Wojskowy), a Polish faction in the revolutionary and split Russian Empire, led by Władysław Raczkiewicz, appointed Dowbor-Muśnicki Commissar of the Petrograd Military District and on August 23 (Old Style) he was appointed commander of the newly formed Polish 1st Corps in Russia, being formed in Russia as part of the Entente forces, serving under the Russian Provisional Government in exchange for its support for some form of Polish autonomy or independence. 

The reorganization process was complicated by the October Revolution of 1917, which brought Bolsheviks to power, but Dowbor-Muśnicki was able to take advantage of the new government's weakness and general anarchy and, by mid-January 1918, had organised his forces into:

 1st Polish Rifle Division (from the former Polish Rifle Division),
 2nd Polish Rifle Division,
 3rd Polish Rifle Division,
 Lancer Division,
 in addition to Officers' (later Knights') Legion.

At that time the I Corps numbered almost 30,000 men, although the number would fall to 23,500 over the coming months.

Combat
At first, after the fall of the Provisional Government, Dowbor-Muśnicki declared that his corps is neutral towards the Russian factions, and its intent is to join the Entente forces to fight against Germany and Austria-Hungary. Soon, however, it became apparent that this was an unreasonable plan, as the Entente forces in the area were weak, and out of two dominant forces — the German Ober Ost forces, and Russian Bolsheviks -  the Bolsheviks were much more hostile towards the Polish forces.

Fights against Bolsheviks 
On , Dowbor-Muśnicki refused an order by the Soviet government to disband the Corps, which quickly led to clashes with the newly formed Red Army and Red Latvian riflemen under Jukums Vācietis. After sporadic fighting in late January, on January 31 Dowbor-Muśnicki's Corps had to retreat from Minsk to Babruysk. On February 2, the Corps started sieging the fortress in Babruysk, still held by a Red Army garrison of 7,000. During this siege, the Knight's Legion distinguished itself and the fortress fell on 11 March. However, the German army forced the Polish forces to give over the fortress.

Brest-Litovsk Treaty 
After the temporary breakdown of the Brest-Litovsk peace negotiations on February 10, the Corps also received a status of auxiliary unit from the Germans and joined the German offensive against the Bolsheviks on February 18, and Minsk was taken on 21 February. After a week, on 28 February, the Polish agreed to work with Germans and thus occupied 6 Belarusian districts in the triangle of Mogilev-Zhlobin-Slutsk, with their headquarters at Babruysk. This strategic disposition cut Bolshevik communications between Petrograd and Ukraine.

After the signing of the Brest-Litovsk Peace Treaty, which gave all of Poland and Belarus to Germany, Dowbor-Muśnicki's corps remained in Belarus for 3 months, regrouping and performing police duties under German occupation authorities. On May 21, 1918, Dowbor-Muśnicki after acknowledging the Regency Council signed an agreement with the Germans, under which the Corps agreed to be disarmed and disbanded, after which, anyhow, the units retreated to Poland, forming the core of the Polish military, which proved decisive later that year during the formation of the Polish Army. Soldiers who remained in Russia mostly joined the Polish II Corps in Russia (primarily the 4th Rifle Division).

Lithuanians in the Corps 
There were numerous Lithuanian soldiers in the Corps. In summer 1917, there were many Lithuanians in the Corps, especially in these particular units:

 1st Regiment - 500 Lithuanians
 2nd Regiment - more than 400 Lithuanians

The 3rd and 4th Regiments also had many Lithuanians in their ranks, with the zapasnam Regiment having 1,000 Lithuanians in it.

Officers' Legion
An 'Officers' Legion' was formed in December 1917 from 300 surplus officers, itself being divided into company-sized 'Legions':

 Cavalry Legion,
 2nd Infantry Legion,
 3rd Artillery Legion,
 Special Weapons Legion.

A half-year later, on 20 April 1918, the Legion had grown to a 1,000 strong and was renamed to 'Knight's Legion', being divided into:

 1st Battalion,
 2nd Battalion,
 Artillery platoon.

Commander
On 6 August 1917, Lavr Kornilov, the Commander-in-Chief of the Provisional Government's armed forces, appointed Józef Dowbor-Muśnicki as the commander of the Polish I Corps.

Organisation
Units attached to the Corps:

 Reserve Brigade:
 1st Reserve Regiment,
 2nd Reserve Regiment
 Officers’ Legion (December 1917) / Knight's Legion (20 April 1918); 
 1st Artillery Brigade 
 2nd Artillery Brigade; 
 1st Heavy Artillery Battalion; 
 Armoured train "Związek Broni"; 
 I Polish Corps Aviation (19 August 1917); 
 1st Engineer Regiment;

1st Polish Rifle Div (autumn 1917) 
 1st-4th Polish Rifle Regiments (February 1917);
 1st Artillery Brigade;
 Engineer Company

2nd Polish Rifle Div (autumn 1917) 

 5th–8th Polish Rifle Regiments (February 1917);
 2nd Artillery Brigade;
 Engineer Company

3rd Polish Rifle Div (autumn 1917) 

 9th–12th Polish Rifle Regiments;
 3rd Artillery Brigade;
 Engineer Company

Polish Lancer Division (spring 1918) 

 1st Lancer Regiment (created on 15 September 1917)
 2nd Lancer Regiment (created on 20 November 1917)
 3rd Lancer Regiment (created on 14 November 1917)
 1st Horse Artillery Battalion (3 mounted batteries);
 Mounted Engineer Squadron

See also
4th Rifle Division (Poland)
5th Rifle Division (Poland)
Polish Legions in World War I
Polish II Corps in Russia (formed in Bessarabia) and Polish III Corps in Russia (formed in Ukraine)
Blue Army (Poland)
Battle of Bobruysk (1918)

References

 

 Nie tylko korpusy… Inne polskie formacje zbrojne w Rosji 1918–1920
 Polskie formacje wojskowe podczas I wojny światowej (a short paragraph confirming the most important facts)
 Korpusy Polskie at WIEM Encyklopedia

External links
 Andrzej Pomian, Niepodleglosc, Przeglad Polski (14 listopada 2003)

Military units and formations established in 1917
Military units and formations disestablished in 1918
Military history of Poland
Military of the Russian Empire
Poland in World War I